The Miryang River is a tributary of the Nakdong River which flows through Miryang City.  It rises in Ulsan metropolitan city, on the slopes of Gohyeonsan, and flows for 101.5 kilometers before joining the Nakdong in Miryang's Samnangjin-eup.  Its narrower upper reaches are often called the Miryangcheon, or "Miryang Stream."

The Miryang River watershed covers 1,421.26 km².  Important tributaries include the Cheongdocheon, flowing south from Cheongdo, and the Dongchangcheon flowing out of Gyeongju.

Most of the Miryang River valley is occupied by rice fields, but great oxbow curve which flows through downtown Miryang has long been used for recreational purposes.  In addition to a riverwalk and open-air arena, the river is overlooked by the famous Yeongnamnu pavilion, which dates from the Joseon Dynasty.   The Arang pavilion also overlooks the river in this area, as does the Miryang City Museum.  Other nearby attractions include the Yeongnam Alps, which run along the eastern flank of the river's lower reaches.

The region just above the confluence of the Miryang and Nakdong rivers is called the Miryang Plain, 4 km wide at its widest point.  This area is known for its fertile soil, and is home to numerous orchards and vegetable farms in addition to rice fields.

Notes

See also 
 Rivers of Korea
 Geography of South Korea

Rivers of South Korea
Rivers of South Gyeongsang Province
Miryang